Botanical gardens in Israel have collections consisting entirely of Israel native and endemic species; most have a collection that include plants from around the world. There are botanical gardens and arboreta in all states and territories of Israel, most are administered by local governments, some are privately owned.
 Dead Sea Ein Gedi Botanic Garden
 Jerusalem Botanical Gardens, Jerusalem
 Tel Aviv University Botanical Garden Tel Aviv
 Arad Botanical Gardens
Ben Gurion University of the Negev 	Beer Sheva 	
Neot Kdomim Biblical Garden 	Ben Shemen 	
Arboretum Dpt. of Natural Resources 	Beit Dagan 	
Botanical Garden "Mikveh-Israel" 	Holon 	
Jericho Botanical Garden 	Jericho 	
Botanical Garden for Native Flora of Israel 	Jerusalem 	
Palestinian Botanical Garden 	West Bank 	
Ramat Hanadiv Memorial Gardens and Nature Park 	Zikhron Yaakov

References 

Israel
Botanical gardens